LJJ might be an acronym or abbreviation for:
LJJ genotype of triploid Ambystoma females, consisting of one A. laterale genome and two A. jeffersonianum genomes; see Mole_salamander#Hybrid_all-female_populations
Long Josephson junction
Lords Justice of Appeal (singular, LJ)